Rush Creek is a creek in Tarrant County, Texas. The creek rises near Mansfield and flows for twelve miles. The creek meets Village Creek to the west of Arlington.

Rush Creek Linear Park 
Rush Creek Linear Park is a 116 acre park in Arlington. The park is split into two sections, with the southern section being located to the east of U.S. Route 287, and the northern section located to the south of Texas State Highway 303 in West Arlington.

See also 

 Lynn Creek

References 

Rivers of Texas
Tarrant County, Texas